Chintapalli is a village in the Atchampet mandal of the Guntur district, India on the south bank of the Krishna River.

It is the site of the former headquarters of Vasireddy Venkatadri Nayudu's zamindari estate in the late 18th century. Nayudu abandoned Chintapalli in protest of alleged mistreatment by his overlords, the British East India Company, and constructed a new capital at Amaravathi.

Demographics
As of the 2011 census,  The town has a population of 4,547 of which 2,272 are males and 2,275 are females. Population of Children with age of 0-6 is 501 which is 11.02% of total population of Chintapalle. The literacy rate of Chintapalle is 52.60%, lower than the state average of 67.02%.

References 

Census towns in Andhra Pradesh